Roy Wycliffe Phillips (born 8 April 1941) is a Barbadian former cricketer. A right-hand batsman and occasional leg spin bowler, Phillips played his early cricket with Maple Club at Holetown.

He later played 18 first-class cricket matches for Barbados and later in England for Gloucestershire.

External links

Living people
1941 births
Barbadian cricketers
Barbados cricketers
Gloucestershire cricketers